Nalli is a surname that occurs in two distinct locations:

Lazio, Italy
Vizianagaram district, Andhra Pradesh, India

List of people with this surname 

 Anthony Nalli, Canadian television producer
 Pia Nalli (1886–1964), Italian mathematician
 Reen Nalli (born 1951), American music executive

 Kiran Nalli, Indian, Chartered Accountant

Indian surnames